Wish You the Best is the first compilation album by Japanese recording artist Mai Kuraki. It was released on January 1, 2004. The compilation won Pop Album of the Year at the 19th Japan Gold Disc Awards.

Commercial performance
Wish You the Best debuted at number-one with 450,127 copies sold making it Kuraki's fifth number-one debut. The album spent three weeks atop of the Oricon albums chart. It charted for a total of 46 weeks of which the album consecutively spent 7 in the top 10. Wish You the Best was the 3rd best selling compilation album of 2004 and 7th best selling album overall.

Wish You the Best is Kuraki's third and last album to be certified Million.

Track listing

Charts

Certifications

References

External links 

2004 compilation albums
Being Inc. compilation albums
Mai Kuraki albums
Giza Studio albums
Japanese-language compilation albums
Albums produced by Daiko Nagato